The 2012 Atlantic hurricane season was an event in the annual hurricane season in the north Atlantic Ocean. For the third year in a row there were 19 named storms. The season officially began on June 1, 2012, and ended on November 30, 2012, dates that conventionally delimit the period of each year when most tropical cyclones develop in the Atlantic basin. Surprisingly, two preseason storms formed: Alberto on May 19, and Beryl on May 26. This was the first such occurrence since the 1951 season. The final storm to dissipate (second-to-last to become a named storm) was Sandy, on October 29. Altogether, ten storms became hurricanes, of which two intensified into major hurricanes.

Storm impact during the season was widespread and ruinous, with the most significant storms in term of loss of life and damage being hurricanes Isaac and Sandy. A Category 1 on the Saffir–Simpson hurricane wind scale, Isaac was a large system that moved ashore the coast of Louisiana on August 12; the storm resulted in 41 deaths overall. The system moved ashore the southern coast of New Jersey as an extratropical cyclone in late October. During its duration as a tropical cyclone, Sandy caused at least $68 billion (2012 USD) in damage and 285 fatalities. Sandy is the second-costliest Atlantic hurricane in recorded history, surpassed only by Hurricane Katrina during the 2005 season.

This timeline includes information that was not operationally released, meaning that data from post-storm reviews by the National Hurricane Center, such as a storm that was not operationally warned upon, has been included. This timeline documents tropical cyclone formations, strengthening, weakening, landfalls, extratropical transitions, and dissipations during the season.

By convention, meteorologists use one time zone when issuing forecasts and making observations: Coordinated Universal Time (UTC), and also use the 24-hour clock (where 00:00 = midnight UTC). The National Hurricane Center uses both UTC and the time zone where the center of the tropical cyclone is currently located. The time zones utilized (east to west) prior to 2020 were: Atlantic, Eastern, and Central. In this timeline, all information is listed by UTC first with the respective regional time included in parentheses. Additionally, figures for maximum sustained winds and position estimates are rounded to the nearest 5 units (knots, miles, or kilometers), following the convention used in the National Hurricane Center's products. Direct wind observations are rounded to the nearest whole number. Atmospheric pressures are listed to the nearest millibar and nearest hundredth of an inch of mercury.

Timeline

May
May 19

 0600 UTC (2:00 a.m. EDT) – A tropical depression develops from an area of low pressure offshore the North Carolina–South Carolina border.
 1200 UTC (8:00 a.m. EDT) – The tropical depression intensifies into Tropical Storm Alberto.

May 20
 0000 UTC (8:00 p.m. EDT May 19) – Tropical Storm Alberto attains its peak intensity with winds of 60 mph (95 km/h) and a minimum barometric pressure of 995 mbar (hPa; 29.38 inHg).

May 22
 1200 UTC (8:00 a.m. EDT) – Tropical Storm Alberto degenerates into a non-convective remnant area of low pressure a few hundred miles north of Bermuda.

May 26
 0000 UTC (8:00 p.m.

May 27

 1800 UTC (2:00 p.m. EDT) – Subtropical Storm Beryl transitions into a tropical storm.
 2300 UTC (7:00 p.m. EDT) – Tropical Storm Beryl attains its peak intensity with winds of 70 mph (110 km/h) and a minimum barometric pressure of 992 mbar (hPa; 29.29 inHg).

May 28
 0410 UTC (12:10 a.m. EDT) – Tropical Storm Beryl makes landfall near Jacksonville Beach, Florida, with winds of 65 mph (100 km/h).
 1200 UTC (8:00 a.m. EDT) – Tropical Storm Beryl weakens to a tropical depression.

May 30
 0600 UTC (2:00 a.m. EDT) – Tropical Depression Beryl regains tropical storm intensity roughly 190 mi (305 km) southwest of Wilmington, North Carolina.
 1800 UTC (2:00 p.m. EDT) – Tropical Depression Beryl degenerates into a non-convective remnant area of low pressure near the coast of North Carolina.

June
June 1
The 2012 Atlantic hurricane season officially begins.

June 18
 1800 UTC (2:00 p.m.

June 19
 1200 UTC (8:00 a.m. AST) – The subtropical storm transitions into Tropical Storm Chris.

June 21

 0600 UTC (2:00 a.m. AST) – Tropical Storm Chris intensifies into a Category 1 hurricane on the Saffir–Simpson hurricane wind scale, becoming the first of the 2012 season.
 1200 UTC (8:00 a.m.

June 22
 0000 UTC (8:00 p.m. AST June 21) – Hurricane Chris weakens to a tropical storm.
 1200 UTC (8:00 a.m.

June 23
 1200 UTC (8:00 a.m.

June 24
 1800 UTC (2:00 p.m. EDT) – Tropical Storm Debby attains maximum sustained winds of 65 mph (100 km/h).

June 25
 0000 UTC (8:00 p.m. EDT June 24) – Tropical Storm Debby attains its peak intensity with a minimum barometric pressure of 990 mbar (hPa; 29.23 inHg).

June 26

 2100 UTC (5:00 p.m. EDT) – Tropical Storm Debby makes landfall near Steinhatchee, Florida, with winds of 40 mph (65 km/h).

June 27
 0000 UTC (8:00 p.m.
 1800 UTC (2:00 p.m. EDT) – Tropical Storm Debby dissipates offshore the eastern coast of Florida.

July
No tropical cyclones form in the Atlantic Ocean during the month of July.

August
August 1
 1200 UTC (8:00 a.m.

August 2
 1200 UTC (8:00 a.m. AST) – Tropical Depression Five intensifies into Tropical Storm Ernesto.

August 3

 1200–1800 UTC (8:00 a.m. – 2:00 p.m. AST) – Tropical Storm Ernesto crosses the Windward Islands into the eastern Caribbean Sea.
 1800 UTC (2:00 p.m.

August 4
 0600 UTC (2:00 a.m.

August 5
 0000 UTC (8:00 p.m. AST August 4) – Tropical Storm Florence attains its peak intensity with winds of 60 mph (95 km/h) and a minimum barometric pressure of 1002 mbar (hPa; 29.59 inHg).

August 6
 0600 UTC (2:00 a.m. AST) – Tropical Storm Florence weakens to a tropical depression.
 1200 UTC (8:00 a.m. AST) – Tropical Depression Florence degenerates into a non-convective remnant area of low pressure roughly midway between the Cape Verde Islands and the Lesser Antilles.

August 7

 1200 UTC (8:00 a.m.

August 8
 0100 UTC (8:00 p.m. CDT August 7) – Hurricane Ernesto makes its first landfall on Cayo Norte in Banco Chinchorro, Mexico, with winds of 90 mph (150 km/h).
 0315 UTC (10:15 p.m. CDT August 7) – Hurricane Ernesto intensifies into a Category 2 hurricane, attains its peak intensity with winds of 100 mph (160 km/h) and a minimum barometric pressure of 973 mbar (hPa; 28.73 inHg), and simultaneously makes its second landfall near Majaual, Mexico.
 1200 UTC (7:00 a.m. CDT) – Hurricane Ernesto weakens to a tropical storm.
 1800–0000 UTC (1:00–7:00 p.m. CDT) – Tropical Storm Ernesto emerges into the Bay of Campeche.

August 9
 1615 UTC (11:15 a.m.
 1800 UTC (2:00 p.m. AST) – Tropical Depression Seven develops from an area of low pressure roughly midway between the Cape Verde Islands and the Lesser Antilles.

August 10
 0600 UTC (1:00 a.m. CDT) – Tropical Storm Ernesto weakens to a tropical depression.
 1200 UTC (7:00 a.m. CDT) – Tropical Depression Ernesto dissipates over the mountainous terrain of Mexico.

August 11
 1200 UTC (8:00 a.m. AST) – Tropical Depression Seven degenerates into a tropical wave east of the Lesser Antilles.

August 15
 1200 UTC (8:00 a.m.

August 16
 0000 UTC (8:00 p.m. AST August 15) – Tropical Depression Eight intensifies into Tropical Storm Gordon.

August 17
 1200 UTC (7:00 a.m.
 1800 UTC (1:00 p.m. CDT) – Tropical Depression Seven intensifies into Tropical Storm Helene and simultaneously attains its peak intensity with winds of 45 mph (75 km/h) and a minimum barometric pressure of 1004 mbar (hPa; 29.65 inHg).

August 18
 0600 UTC (1:00 a.m. CDT) – Tropical Storm Helene weakens to a tropical depression.
 0600 UTC (2:00 a.m.
 1200 UTC (7:00 a.m. CDT) – Tropical Depression Helene makes landfall near Tampico, Mexico, with winds of 35 mph (55 km/h).

August 19
 0000 UTC (7:00 p.m. CDT August 18) – Tropical Depression Helene degenerates into a non-convective remnant area of low pressure over the mountainous terrain of Mexico.
 0000 UTC (8:00 p.m. AST August 18) – Hurricane Gordon attains its peak intensity with winds of 110 mph (175 km/h) and a minimum barometric pressure of 965 mbar (hPa; 28.49 inHg).

August 20
 0530 UTC (1:30 a.m. AST) – Hurricane Gordon makes landfall on Santa Maria Island, Azores, with winds of 75 mph (120 km/h).
 1200 UTC (8:00 a.m. AST) – Hurricane Gordon weakens to a tropical storm.
 1800 UTC (2:00 p.m. AST) – Tropical Storm Gordon degenerates into a non-convective remnant area of low pressure northeast of the Azores.

August 21
 0600 UTC (2:00 a.m.
 1800 UTC (2:00 p.m.

August 22
 0600 UTC (2:00 a.m.
 1800–0000 UTC August 23 (2:00–8:00 p.m. AST) – Tropical Storm Isaac crosses the Windward Islands into the eastern Caribbean Sea.

August 23
 1200 UTC (8:00 a.m.
 1800 UTC (2:00 p.m. AST) – Tropical Storm Joyce attains its peak intensity with winds of 40 mph (65 km/h) and a minimum barometric pressure of 1006 mbar (hPa; 29.71 inHg).

August 24
 0000 UTC (8:00 p.m. AST August 23) – Tropical Storm Joyce weakens to a tropical depression.
 1200 UTC (8:00 a.m. AST) – Tropical Depression Joyce degenerates into a non-convective remnant area of low pressure.

August 25
 0600 UTC (2:00 a.m. AST) – Tropical Storm Isaac makes its first landfall near Jacmel, Haiti, with winds of 65 mph (100 km/h).
 1500 UTC (11:00 a.m. EDT) – Tropical Storm Isaac makes its second landfall near Cajobabo, Guantánamo, Cuba, with winds of 60 mph (95 km/h).

August 27

 0000–0600 UTC (8:00 p.m. August 26–2:00 a.m. AST) – Tropical Storm Isaac crosses the Straits of Florida into the Gulf of Mexico.

August 28
 1200 UTC (7:00 a.m.
 1800 UTC (2:00 p.m.

August 29
 0000 UTC (7:00 p.m. CDT August 28) – Hurricane Isaac makes its third landfall at Southwest Pass at the mouth of the Mississippi River, with winds of 80 mph (130 km/h).
 0000 UTC (8:00 p.m. AST August 28) – Tropical Depression Eleven intensifies into Tropical Storm Kirk.
 0300 UTC (10:00 a.m. CDT) – Hurricane Isaac attains its peak intensity with winds of 80 mph (130 km/h) and a minimum barometric pressure of 965 mbar (hPa; 28.5 inHg).
 0800 UTC (3:00 a.m. CDT) – Hurricane Isaac makes its fourth and final landfall near Port Fourchon, Louisiana, with winds of 80 mph (130 km/h).
 1800 UTC (1:00 p.m.

August 30

 0000 UTC (8:00 p.m.
 1200 UTC (8:00 a.m. AST) – Tropical Storm Kirk intensifies into a Category 1 hurricane.
 1200 UTC (8:00 a.m. EDT) – Tropical Depression Twelve intensifies into Tropical Storm Leslie.

August 31
 0000 UTC (7:00 p.m. CDT August 30) – Tropical Storm Isaac weakens to a tropical depression over southern Arkansas.
 0600 UTC (2:00 a.m. AST) – Hurricane Kirk intensifies into a Category 2 hurricane and simultaneously attains its peak intensity with winds of 105 mph (165 km/h) and a minimum barometric pressure of 970 mbar (hPa; 28.64 inHg).
 1800 UTC (2:00 p.m. AST) – Hurricane Kirk weakens to a Category 1 hurricane.

September
September 1
 1200 UTC (7:00 a.m.
 1200 UTC (8:00 a.m. AST) – Hurricane Kirk weakens to a tropical storm.

September 3
 0000 UTC (8:00 p.m.
 0600 UTC (2:00 a.m. AST) – Tropical Depression Thirteen develops from an area of low pressure.

September 4
 0600 UTC (2:00 a.m.

September 5
 0600 UTC (2:00 a.m. AST) – Tropical Storm Leslie intensifies into a Category 1 hurricane.
 1200 UTC (8:00 a.m.
 1800 UTC (2:00 p.m. AST) – Tropical Storm Michael intensifies into a Category 1 hurricane.

September 6

 0600 UTC (2:00 a.m. AST) – Hurricane Michael intensifies into a Category 2 hurricane.
 1200 UTC (8:00 a.m. AST) – Hurricane Michael intensifies into a Category 3 hurricane, the first major hurricane of the season, and simultaneously attains its peak intensity with winds of 115 mph (185 km/h) and a minimum barometric pressure of 964 mbar (hPa; 28.47 inHg).
 1800 UTC (2:00 p.m. AST) – Hurricane Michael weakens to a Category 2 hurricane.

September 7
 1200 UTC (8:00 a.m. AST) – Hurricane Leslie weakens to a tropical storm.

September 8
 0000 UTC (8:00 p.m. AST September 7) – Hurricane Michael weakens to a Category 1 hurricane.
 1200 UTC (8:00 a.m. AST) – Hurricane Michael re-intensifies into a Category 2 hurricane.

September 9
 1800 UTC (2:00 p.m. AST) – Hurricane Michael weakens to a Category 1 for a second time.

September 10
 1200 UTC (8:00 a.m. AST) – Tropical Storm Leslie re-intensifies into a Category 1 hurricane.
 1200 UTC (8:00 a.m.

September 11

 0000 UTC (8:00 p.m. AST September 10) – Hurricane Michael weakens to a tropical storm.
 0600 UTC (2:00 a.m. AST) – Hurricane Leslie attains its peak intensity with a minimum barometric pressure of 968 mbar (hPa; 28.58 inHg).
 0900 UTC (5:00 a.m.
 1800 UTC (2:00 p.m. AST) – Tropical Storm Michael degenerates into a non-convective remnant area of low pressure roughly 1150 mi (1850 km) northeast of Bermuda.

September 12
 0000 UTC (8:00 p.m. AST September 11) – Tropical Depression Fourteen intensifies into Tropical Storm Nadine.

September 14
 1800 UTC (2:00 p.m. AST) – Tropical Storm Nadine intensifies into a Category 1 hurricane.

September 17
 0000 UTC (8:00 p.m. AST September 16) – Hurricane Nadine weakens to a tropical storm.

September 21
 1800 UTC (2:00 p.m.

September 23
 0000 UTC (8:00 p.m. AST September 22) – The remnants of Tropical Storm Nadine regenerate into a tropical storm south of the Azores.

September 28
 1200 UTC (8:00 a.m. AST) – Tropical Storm Nadine intensifies into a Category 1 hurricane for a second time.

September 30

 1200 UTC (8:00 a.m.

October
October 1
 1200 UTC (8:00 a.m. AST) – Hurricane Nadine weakens to a tropical storm.

October 3
 0600 UTC (2:00 a.m.
 1800 UTC (2:00 p.m. AST) – Tropical Depression Fifteen intensifies into Tropical Storm Oscar.

October 4

 0000 UTC (8:00 p.m.

October 5
 0600 UTC (2:00 a.m. AST) – Tropical Storm Oscar attains its peak intensity with winds of 50 mph (85 km/h) and a minimum barometric pressure of 994 mbar (hPa; 29.35 inHg).
 1800 UTC (2:00 p.m. AST) – Tropical Storm Oscar dissipates over the central Atlantic Ocean.

October 11
 0000 UTC (8:00 p.m. EDT October 10) – Tropical Depression Sixteen develops from an area of low pressure.
 0600 UTC (2:00 a.m.

October 12
 0000 UTC (8:00 p.m. EDT October 11) – Tropical Storm Patty attains its peak intensity with winds of 45 mph (75 km/h) and a minimum barometric pressure of 1005 mbar (hPa; 29.68 inHg).
 1800 UTC (2:00 p.m.

October 13
 0600 UTC (2:00 a.m. EDT) – Tropical Storm Patty weakens to a tropical depression.
 1200 UTC (8:00 a.m. EDT) – Tropical Depression Patty dissipates northeast of the Bahamas.

October 14
 0000–0600 UTC (8:00 p.m. October 13–2:00 a.m. AST) – Tropical Storm Rafael crosses the Leeward Islands into the western Atlantic Ocean.

October 15
 0600 UTC (2:00 a.m.

October 16

 1200 UTC (8:00 a.m.

October 17
 1800 UTC (2:00 p.m. AST) – Hurricane Rafael transitions into an extratropical cyclone several hundred miles southeast of Nova Scotia.

October 22
 1200 UTC (8:00 a.m.
 1800 UTC (2:00 p.m. EDT) – Tropical Depression Eighteen intensifies into Tropical Storm Sandy.
 1800 UTC (2:00 p.m.

October 24

 0000 UTC (8:00 p.m. AST October 23) – Tropical Depression Nineteen intensifies into Tropical Storm Tony.
 1200 UTC (8:00 a.m.
 1200 UTC (8:00 a.m. AST) – Tropical Storm Tony attains its peak intensity with winds of 50 mph (85 km/h) and a minimum barometric pressure of 1000 mbar (hPa; 29.53 inHg) roughly midway between the northern Leeward Islands and the Azores.
 1900 UTC (3:00 p.m. EDT) – Hurricane Sandy makes its first landfall near Bull Bay, Jamaica, with winds of 85 mph (140 km/h).

October 25
 0000 UTC (8:00 p.m. EDT October 24) – Hurricane Sandy intensifies into a Category 2 hurricane.
 0525 UTC (1:25 a.m.
 0900–1200 UTC (5:00–8:00 a.m. EDT) – Hurricane Sandy crosses Cuba into the Bahamas.
 1800 UTC (2:00 p.m. AST) – Tropical Storm Tony transitions into an extratropical cyclone.
 0900 UTC (5:00 a.m. EDT) – Hurricane Sandy weakens to a Category 2 hurricane.

October 26
 0000 UTC (8:00 p.m. EDT October 25) – Hurricane Sandy weakens to a Category 1 hurricane.

October 27

 0000 UTC (8:00 p.m. EDT October 26) – Hurricane Sandy weakens to a tropical storm.
 1200 UTC (8:00 a.m.

October 29
 1200 UTC (8:00 a.m.
 1800 UTC (2:00 p.m. EDT) – Hurricane Sandy weakens to a Category 1 hurricane for a second time and simultaneously attains its peak intensity with a minimum barometric pressure of 940 mbar (hPa; 27.76 inHg).
 2100 UTC (5:00 p.m.
 2330 UTC (7:30 p.m. EDT) – Hurricane Sandy made landfall as a hybrid subtropical storm near Brigantine, New Jersey, with winds of 80 mph (130 km/h). thus being given the name "Superstorm Sandy."

November
No tropical cyclones form in the Atlantic Ocean during the month of November.

November 30
The 2012 Atlantic hurricane season officially ends.

See also

Lists of Atlantic hurricanes
Timeline of the 2012 Pacific hurricane season

Notes

References

External links

 2012 Tropical Cyclone Advisory Archive, National Hurricane Center and Central Pacific Hurricane Center
 Hurricanes and Tropical Storms – Annual 2012, National Centers for Environmental Information

2012 Atlantic hurricane season
Articles which contain graphical timelines
2012 Atl T